The jeweled toad (Incilius gemmifer) is a species of toad in the family Bufonidae. It is endemic to Mexico and known from the Pacific Coast between Acapulco (Guerrero state) and Jamiltepec (Oaxaca state).
Its natural habitats are xeric and deciduous forests. It is a rare species threatened by habitat loss caused by agricultural expansion, wood extraction, and the expansion of plantations.

References

gemmifer
Amphibians described in 1940
Endemic amphibians of Mexico
Fauna of the Southern Pacific dry forests
Taxonomy articles created by Polbot